BC Place is a multi-purpose stadium in Vancouver, British Columbia, Canada. Located at the north side of False Creek, it is owned and operated by the BC Pavilion Corporation (PavCo), a crown corporation of the province.

The venue is currently the home of the BC Lions of the Canadian Football League (CFL), Vancouver Whitecaps FC of Major League Soccer (MLS), the annual Canada Sevens (part of the World Rugby Sevens Series), as well as the BC Sports Hall of Fame.

Opened on June 19, 1983, BC Place was originally an indoor structure with an air-supported roof, the world's largest at the time. Following the 2010 Winter Olympics, it was closed for 16 months as part of an extensive revitalization, the centrepiece of which was replacing the inflatable roof with a retractable roof supported by cables. Once construction was completed, the stadium's new roof was also the largest of its type.

BC Place was the main stadium for the 2010 Winter Olympics and 2010 Winter Paralympics, the 2012 CONCACAF Women's Olympic Qualifying Tournament, as well as a venue for multiple matches including the championship match for the 2015 FIFA Women's World Cup. The stadium is set to host multiple matches during the 2026 FIFA World Cup, which is estimated to cost  $240 million to $260 million to for staging, planning and hosting in Vancouver.

History

Opening and 20th century

Construction of the stadium started in 1981, with Dillingham Construction contracted to build the stadium, designed by architecture firm Studio Phillips Barratt, Ltd. BC Place was built as part of the preparations for the 1986 World's Fair, Expo 86. Upon its completion in 1983, the stadium, designed by structural engineers Geiger Berger Associates, was the world's largest air-supported domed stadium until May 4, 2010, when it was deflated for the last time in preparation for the erection of its new retractable roof.  Its original air-supported design was similar to the Hubert H. Humphrey Metrodome in Minneapolis, Minnesota, which was home to both the Minnesota Twins Major League Baseball team and the Minnesota Vikings National Football League team.

The stadium held its grand opening on June 19, 1983. The first major event held in the stadium came the next day, June 20, when the Vancouver Whitecaps hosted the Seattle Sounders in a Monday night North American Soccer League (NASL) game with attendance announced at 60,342. On June 23, 1983, the BC Lions played their first game at the new stadium, a preseason 41–19 victory against the Calgary Stampeders with 53,472 in attendance. A month later, on July 24, 1983, a crowd of 41,810 watched the BC Lions defeat the Saskatchewan Roughriders 44–28 in the Lions' first regular season game at the stadium. The venue would host the Soccer Bowl '83 and the 1983 Grey Cup game later that year. On September 18, 1984 Pope John Paul II addressed an over-capacity crowd for "A Celebration of Life". The celebration was part of the papal visit to the Archdiocese of Vancouver. It was one of the most heavily attended events in the stadium. The Pope's Celebration of Life was followed a few months later by the Canadian Pacific Billy Graham Crusade, which drew similar numbers each night.

The stadium was then used for the opening and closing ceremonies of the 1986 World Exposition on Transportation and Communication (Expo '86). Accepting an invitation by the Province of British Columbia, their Royal Highnesses Prince Charles and Princess Diana made themselves available to take part in the opening ceremonies. To great fanfare, they officially proclaimed the World's Fair open on May 2, 1986. In 1987, an exhibition match of Australian rules football was played at the stadium and drew a crowd of 32,789  a record for the largest AFL/VFL crowd outside of Australia. The stadium also held an NFL exhibition game in 1998 when the San Francisco 49ers beat the Seattle Seahawks 24–21 in the American Bowl.

2007 roof deflation
On January 5, 2007, snow accumulated on the air-supported Teflon Fibreglass roof, despite strict zero accumulation of ice guidelines and ice accumulation structural warnings. The accumulation caused a tear in the roof's ETFE-coated fabric close to Gate G on the south side where the roof meets the top of the concrete bowl. The tear grew quickly as air escaped through it, whereupon maintenance staff performed an intentional, controlled deflation to protect the integrity of the roof's intact fabric panels. As it was designed to do, the deflated roof rested on its steel support cables 6 metres (20 ft) above the seating and the field. Normally, the roof had a rise of 27 metres (90 ft) above the top of the bowl when inflated. No one was injured during the incident, although rain and melted snow flooded the bowl and subsequently had to be pumped out.

An independent report indicated that an accidental rapid pressurization combined with lightly gusting wind and a location of previously undetected damage caused the tear. The damaged panel was replaced with a temporary one on January 19 and the roof was re-inflated. The BC Contractors Association held an exhibition in the stadium over the week of January 23, during which the roof leaked in several places when it rained. The temporary panel was successfully replaced with a permanent one in June 2007, just prior to the start of the 2007 CFL season.

Renovation and roof replacement

On May 16, 2008, it was announced that over $150 million in major renovations would be carried out on BC Place Stadium. The work was done in two phases. The first phase involved upgrades to seating, washrooms, concessions, and luxury suites, as well as the reinforcement of the existing ring beam at the top of the building and was completed in October 2009, in time for the 2010 Winter Olympics.

Work on the retractable roof began in May 2010, with PCL Westcoast Constructors Inc. contracted to construct the roof designed by architecture firm Stantec Architecture Ltd. and structural engineering firm Geiger Engineers, with Schlaich Bergermann & Partner serving as consulting engineers and Genivar, Inc. acting as services engineers. Geiger also designed the stadium's new centre-hung scoreboard. The roof's construction began immediately after the completion of the 2010 Winter Paralympics and the final deflation of the air-supported roof. The official budget for the completed Phase 1 upgrades plus the revitalization project was $514 million. The new roof, a cable-supported retractable roof system first used with the Commerzbank-Arena in Frankfurt, Germany, is the largest of its kind. The opening measures , the same size as the field below. The fabric roof retracts into and is hidden by a pod in the centre of the opening, above the suspended videoboard.

The updated stadium also features the second largest centre-hung high definition scoreboard in North America, after the one in AT&T Stadium. In addition, a new artificial turf developed by Polytan was installed at an estimated cost of $1.2 million. It is designed to achieve FIFA 2-star certification, the highest rating possible.

TSN analyst and former CFL player Chris Schultz praised both the design and engineering of the new stadium. Columnist Brian Hutchinson has praised the renovations for significantly improving the acoustics, and providing a bright and airy feel to the stadium. These were aspects that were missing in its previous air-supported roof incarnation, as well as the Montreal Olympic Stadium and the Rogers Centre (formerly SkyDome).

The artificial turf installed between September 2011 and April 2015 drew criticism, notably its lacklustre characteristics for playing professional level soccer. A new artificial turf was installed in May 2015, prior to the FIFA Women's World Cup Canada 2015. The total cost of the turf upgrade was $1.327 million, with Canada Soccer and Rugby Canada contributing $500,000 CDN to the project. Liam Middleton, Canada's Rugby Sevens coach, stated that the new surface was "better than some natural grass surfaces they've played on."

Summary of renovations
 New retractable roof is the largest cable supported retractable roof in the world.
 Revolving doors replaced with clear glass doors, which allows the stadium to be accessed much more easily.
 Old brown glass around building replaced with light green glass which lets more light in and makes stadium brighter.
 BC Lions locker room completely expanded and refurbished: Old lockers were taken out, sanded down, refinished, and put back in. New cubicles were also put in with individual lighting for players. Locker room also sports a new floor called "sport floor".
 New synthetic turf, called Polytan LigaTurf RS+, was installed as the new playing surface.
 Added 1,140 new HDTV screens. Screens work through a system called Stadium Vision. Each screen runs on a separate video source, allowing menu boards at concourse concession stands to show game updates to fans as they order from concession stands.
 All concourses widened and refurbished.
 Added 140 additional portable concession stands. Storage of food and supplies will be in concession stands.
 50 fully refurbished private suites and 1,300 newly refurbished premium Club Seats.
 Wheel chair seating now at every price point and level of the stadium.
 New upgraded washrooms, and access ramps with new lighting.
 New state of the art sound system.
 New sport lighting in stadium: 10% of lighting replaced by hot strip lighting, which gives instant on and off.

Post-renovation

The opening and closing ceremonies of the XXI Olympic Winter Games and the opening ceremonies of the X Paralympic Winter Games were also held in BC Place Stadium in February and March 2010, respectively. The stadium was the first air-supported structure and 24th venue to host the opening ceremonies of the Winter Olympics. It was also both the third CFL venue and the third Canadian venue to have served as an Olympic Stadium, after Montreal's Olympic Stadium and Calgary's McMahon Stadium.

The 47th Vanier Cup was the first Canadian university football championship paired with the Grey Cup Festival and played Friday, November 25, 2011, between the McMaster Marauders and Laval Rouge et Or in front of 24,935. Nicknamed "Best Game... Ever", it is widely regarded as one of the most exciting Canadian Football games of all time with McMaster winning 41–38 in double overtime. It was the first championship played in the newly renovated facility.

The 2012 CONCACAF Women's Olympic Qualifying Tournament final between the United States and Canada played at the stadium was the highest attendance for a women's CONCACAF Olympic Qualifying game with 25,427 people in attendance.

The 2014 NHL Heritage Classic took place March 2, 2014, in BC Place, with the Ottawa Senators facing off against the home team Vancouver Canucks. It was the first of the NHL's "outdoor" games to be played in what technically is an indoor stadium, albeit one of a larger capacity than a typical NHL arena.

BC Place hosted its second major international sports competition, the 2015 FIFA Women's World Cup. Five group stage matches, two round of 16 matches, and one quarter-final were held in the stadium during June 2015, and the Final between Japan and the United States was played here on July 5, 2015.

The stadium hosted round six of the HSBC World Rugby Sevens Series 2015–16 series.

BC Place will host several matches during the 2026 World Cup as one of two Canadian venues. During the event, the stadium will be temporarily renamed to "Vancouver Stadium" in accordance with FIFA's policy on corporate sponsored names, despite the stadium not having a corporate sponsor.

Tenants

Currently, BC Place's main sports tenants are the BC Lions of the Canadian Football League (CFL) and Vancouver Whitecaps FC of Major League Soccer (MLS). The stadium was also home of the Vancouver Whitecaps of the North American Soccer League (NASL) during the early 1980s. The Vancouver Nighthawks, a member of the World Basketball League, played the 1988 season at BC Place. Soccer Bowl '83 was also held at BC Place, where the Tulsa Roughnecks defeated the Toronto Blizzard 2–0. When it was built, the floor of BC Place was too small to accommodate a full-sized CFL regulation field, as a result BC Place became the first CFL stadium to use a 20-yard end zone instead of the regulation 25-yard end zone then in use. Although controversial at first, the smaller end zone proved highly popular with players and was adopted league-wide in 1986.

The stadium has hosted the CFL's championship game, the Grey Cup, nine times: in 1983, 1986, 1987, 1990, 1994, 1999, 2005, 2011, and 2014. Notable was the 1994 championship, in which the hometown BC Lions defeated the U.S. expansion team the Baltimore Football Club on a last-second field goal by Lui Passaglia, preventing the Grey Cup trophy from leaving Canada (Baltimore would win the Grey Cup the following year). The stadium hosted the 99th Grey Cup in 2011 after the new roof was completed (this Grey Cup game was also won by the BC Lions at home).

BC Place was also built in a baseball configuration to attract a future Major League Baseball (MLB) franchise. It can accommodate a baseball diamond with retractable seating sections making room for right field. The Vancouver Canadians of the Triple-A Pacific Coast League played several series of games there between 1984 and 1988, including games 1 and 2 of the 1985 league championship series. Numerous MLB spring training games were also played, including in 1984 (Toronto Blue Jays and Milwaukee Brewers), 1986 (Chicago Cubs, San Diego Padres, Montreal Expos and Seattle Mariners), 1993 (Toronto, Seattle, Milwaukee and Detroit Tigers) and 1994 MLB season (Toronto, Seattle, Montreal and Colorado Rockies). The Mariners explored plans to play regular season games at BC Place in the mid-1990s, but were unable to receive approval from MLB.

In the mid-1990s the stadium was planned to be the home of the yet-to-be named Vancouver team, a charter franchise of the United League (UL) which was planned to be a third league of MLB; it never came to fruition.

Transportation

The stadium is served by two SkyTrain stations on two lines: the Expo Line (TransLink)'s Stadium–Chinatown to the East, and the Canada Line's Yaletown–Roundhouse to the west. TransLink also operates several bus routes that stop near BC Place. The False Creek Ferries and Aquabus also serve the stadium, docking at the nearby Plaza of Nations.

Accolades
 Project of the Year for the 2012 International Stadium Business Awards
 National Council of Structural Engineers Associations' 2012 Outstanding Project Award in the Forensic/Renovation/Retrofit/Rehabilitation Structures category
 One of the 2012 Awards of Excellence presented to GENIVAR and Geiger Engineers by the Association of Consulting Engineering Companies, Canada
 The 2013 ENR Global Best Project Winner for Sports/Entertainment

See also
 List of Canadian Football League stadiums
 List of Major League Soccer stadiums
 List of soccer stadiums in Canada

References

External links

 

Venues of the 2010 Winter Olympics
American Bowl venues
Baseball venues in British Columbia
Canadian Football League venues
Convention centres in Canada
Expo 86
Major League Soccer stadiums
Multi-purpose stadiums in British Columbia
Olympic stadiums
2015 FIFA Women's World Cup stadiums
2026 FIFA World Cup Stadiums
Retractable-roof stadiums
Soccer venues in British Columbia
Sports venues completed in 1983
Sports venues in Vancouver
World's fair architecture in Vancouver
North American Soccer League (1968–1984) stadiums
1983 establishments in British Columbia
Canadian football venues in British Columbia
Rugby union stadiums in British Columbia
World Rugby Sevens Series venues